Canadian Cemetery No. 2  is a Commonwealth War Graves Commission burial ground for the dead of World War I situated on the grounds of the Canadian National Vimy Memorial Park near the French town of Neuville-Saint-Vaast.

The cemetery was originally named CD 5 and established as a battlefield cemetery of the Canadian 4th Division for Canadian troops killed in the Battle of Vimy Ridge. Battlefield clearances of the surrounding area in 1919 significantly increased the size of the cemetery. The cemetery was again reopened for burials in 1931, receiving its last Canadian burial in 1947. Despite the cemetery's name, the large majority of the dead are British.

The cemetery now contains the graves of 2,966 Commonwealth soldiers, a large portion of which are unidentified. The cemetery covers an area of 10,869 square metres and is enclosed by low walls of coursed stone.

Commemoration
Twenty-nine Canadian soldiers buried in 11th Canadian Infantry Brigade Cemetery and near Gunner's Crater, both in Givenchy-en-Gohelle, but whose graves are now lost are commemorated by special memorial headstones, inscribed to this effect.

Notable graves 
  
Private Charles Milligan, 10th Bn Cameronians (Scottish Rifles) was executed for desertion June 3, 1917. He is now buried in plot 19. A. 14.

References

External links

 
 Canadian Cemetery No. 2, Neuville-Saint Vaast at Find a Grave

Canadian military memorials and cemeteries
Commonwealth War Graves Commission cemeteries in France
World War I in the Pas-de-Calais
1917 establishments in France
Cemeteries in Pas-de-Calais